Yarim-Lim I, also given as Yarimlim, (reigned ) was the second king of the ancient Amorite kingdom of Yamhad in modern-day Aleppo, Syria.

Family

Parentage
Yarim-Lim was the son and successor of the first king Sumu-Epuh and his queen Sumunna-Abi.

Wife and Children
His wife was Gashera, of unknown parents. She outlived her husband and became a strong-willed widow who was part of politics during the reign of Hammurabi.

Their daughter Shibtu married Zimri-Lim of Mari.

Reign

Early Reign and Conflicts
The kingdom of Yamhad was being threatened by the Assyrian king Shamshi-Adad I who had surrounded Yamhad through his alliance with Charchemish and Urshu to the north, Qatna to the south, and conquering Mari to the east, appointing his son Yasmah-Adad on its throne. Yarim-Lim ascended the throne after his father was killed in 1780 BC during his campaigns against Shamshi-Adad. He was able to stand up to Shamshi-Adad by surrounding him with deft alliances with Hammurabi of Babylon and Ibal-pi-el II of Eshnunna. His alliance with Hammurabi was credited with saving Babylon from an Assyrian attack by attacking their rear.

In 1777 BC, Yarim-Lim conquered the city of Tuttul, on the confluence of the rivers Balikh and Euphrates. He appointed his ally, Zimri-Lim, the heir to the throne of Mari who was living in exile at his court, as king. When Shamshi-Adad died in 1776 BC, he helped Zimrilim regain his throne in Mari and oust Yasmah-Adad. The alliance between Mari and Yamhad was cemented with the royal marriage between Zimrilim and Yarim-Lim's daughter Shibtu. Two days after the marriage ceremony queen Sumunna-Abi died.

Ibal-pi-el II of Eshnuna exploited the death of Shamshi-Adad to pursuit an expansionist policy, advancing on the account of Assyria and causing stress to the alliance. He later allied himself with Elam, the enemy of Hammurabi who was Yarim-Lim's ally.

Relations with Mari
Zimri-Lim's ascension to the throne with the help of Yarim-Lim I affected the status of Mari, Zimri-Lim referred to Yarim-Lim as his father and acted under the guidance of the Yamhadite main deity Hadad, of which Yarim-Lim was the mediator.

The tablets of Mari recorded many events that revealed Zimri-Lim's subordination. On two occasions Zimri-Lim demanded the extradition of his subordinates from Yarim-Lim I. The first case was related to a vassal king of Zimri-Lim who addressed him as a brother instead of a father and the demand was refused, while the second was through the Mariote ambassador in Aleppo Daris-Libur in which Zimri-Lim asked for some fugitives to which Yarim-Lim answered with decline twice before agreeing on the Mariote ambassador's third attempt.

At one instance Nur-Sin the Mariote ambassador in Aleppo wrote to his master for the handing of an estate called Alahtum to Hadad (meaning Aleppo), and in another instance, Ibal-pi-el offered peace and fixing the borders to Zimri-Lim who sent envoys to Yarim-Lim asking for authorization which was not given, leading Zimri-Lim to refuse the treaty on three occasions.

Later Reign and Succession

Yarim-Lim extended his influence to several other important city-states in Syria through alliance and vassalage, including Urshu and the rich kingdom of Ugarit. The relationship between Qatna and Yamhad seems to have improved during Yarim-Lim's reign as well. The armies of Aleppo campaigned as far as Elam near the modern southern Iraqi-Iranian borders: a tablet discovered at Mari revealed the extent of those military interventions in Mesopotamia; the tablet includes a declaration of war against Dēr and Diniktum in retaliation for their evil deeds, a reminder to the king of Dēr about the military help given to him for fifteen years by Yarim-Lim and the stationing of 500 Aleppan warships for twelve years in Diniktum. By the time of his death, Yarim-Lim, had more than twenty kings as vassals and allies. According to Historian William J. Hamblin he was at the time the "mightiest ruler in the Near East outside of Egypt," He died c. 1764 BC and was succeeded by his son Hammurabi I.

References

Citations

Bibliography

18th-century BC rulers
Kings of Yamhad
People from Aleppo
Amorite kings
18th-century BC deaths
Year of birth unknown
Yamhad dynasty
18th-century BC people